Ivan Aleksandrovich Karatygin (born 17 January 1982) is a former Russian professional football player.

Honours
 Russian Second Division, Zone West best defender: 2010.

Club career
He played in the Russian Football National League for FC Torpedo Vladimir in the 2011–12 season.

References

External links
 

1982 births
People from Vladimir, Russia
Living people
Russian footballers
Association football defenders
FC Sokol Saratov players
FC Torpedo Vladimir players
Sportspeople from Vladimir Oblast